Late on the afternoon of October 24, 1961, police went to a house in Lincoln, Massachusetts, United States, after a neighbor reported seeing blood leading from the house to the driveway. She had made the discovery after a young girl living in the house had returned from a playdate to find her mother, Joan Carolyn Risch (née Bard; May 12, 1930), absent. Several unconfirmed sightings of an apparently disoriented Risch walking on nearby roads later that day were reported.

Blood matching Risch's type was found smeared in the kitchen, and other evidence initially suggested to police that she had been abducted, though her two-year-old son was found safe asleep in his room. Later, however, it was discovered that Risch had borrowed several library books about murders and disappearances, including one with similarities to her case. This led to speculation that she had staged her disappearance, perhaps to escape an uncomfortable domestic life; evidence was later discovered of a troubled past which may have motivated such a scheme. Other theories suggest that Risch suffered an accident on the nearby construction site for the Massachusetts Route 128 freeway. The case remains unsolved.

Background
Joan Risch was born Joan Carolyn Bard in Brooklyn, New York, in 1930 to Harold and Josephine Bard. By the age of eight her family had moved to New Jersey where, in 1939, her parents died in what was later described as a suspicious fire. It was also later reported that Joan told an acquaintance that she had been sexually abused as a child. After the fire, she went to live with relatives who formally adopted her. Joan took their last name, Nattrass, as her own, applying for a Social Security number under that name.

After graduating in 1952 from Wilson College in Chambersburg, Pennsylvania, with a degree in English literature, Joan went to work in publishing. She started as a secretary, later moving to supervise the secretarial pool and ultimately became an editorial assistant at Harcourt Brace and World and later Thomas Y. Crowell Co. In 1956 she married an executive at one of the companies, Martin Risch, and left work to raise a family with him.

Living in Ridgefield, Connecticut, the couple had their first child, Lillian, the next year, and a son, David, in 1959. In April 1961 they moved to Lincoln, Massachusetts, outside Boston, where they easily integrated into the community. Joan became active in the League of Women Voters, while Martin pursued a career with the Fitchburg Paper Company. Joan spoke of becoming a teacher after the children got older.

Disappearance
On the morning of October 24, Martin Risch got up early and left the house in his car for Logan Airport to catch an 8a.m. flight to New York City. It was a business trip he had planned earlier, with the intention of staying overnight in Manhattan. Shortly after his departure, Joan woke the children and served them breakfast. She took her son across the street to the house of a neighbor, Barbara Barker, and left with Lillian in her car, a blue 1951 Chevrolet, for an appointment with a Bedford dentist who had been recommended by her college friend Morton.

Following the appointment, Joan took Lillian on a brief shopping trip to a nearby department store, paying in cash. At the family home on Old Bedford Road, milk and mail were delivered while the Risches were absent. Neither the milkman nor postman reported anything unusual at the residence when questioned later.

After picking up David at the Barkers', Joan and the children returned home at roughly 11:15 am. Shortly afterward, a delivery driver for a dry cleaner came to the house to pick up several of Martin's suits. He entered the house to do so and did not recall anything out of the ordinary about Joan or the house. Following his visit, Joan changed from the more formal clothing she had worn to the dentist's appointment and her shopping into a blue housedress and white sneakers.

Joan made lunch for her children and put David into his room for his afternoon nap, which almost always lasted until 2p.m. At 1p.m., Barbara Barker brought her son, Douglas, also 4, over to play with Lillian. During the time they were there, they observed Joan come in and out to prune some plants and put the shears she had used back in the garage.

Shortly before 2p.m. Joan came out again and took the children back across the street to the Barkers' house. She told the two she would be back. Lillian later told police she did not see anyone else in the area at the time. She and Douglas played on a swing set from which they could not see the Risch house.

Around 2:15p.m., Barker briefly saw Joan, wearing what she thought was a trench coat over her clothing, move quickly up her driveway, carrying something red with outstretched arms from her car towards the garage. At the time she assumed her neighbor was chasing one of the children. It was the last confirmed time anyone saw Joan Risch.

An hour later, Virginia Keene, the daughter of the Risches' next-door neighbors, got off the school bus and as she neared her home, she recalled seeing an unfamiliar car, possibly a General Motors model, dirty and two-tone with one of the colors being blue. Five minutes later, another local resident who lived on a nearby street said they stopped while driving up Old Bedford to let a car back out of either the Keenes' or the Risches' driveway. Both Virginia and her mother said there was no car in their driveway at that time.

Barker took Lillian back to her home at 3:40p.m., intending to take her children out on a shopping trip with her. Believing Joan was still in the house, she left. When she returned at 4:15p.m., Lillian came back to the Barkers' house. "Mommy is gone and the kitchen is covered with red paint", she told Barbara. Her brother was crying in his crib because his diaper needed to be changed. After Barbara went to the Risch house herself and verified Lillian's account, she called the police at 4:33p.m.

Investigation

Sgt. Mike McHugh of the Lincoln police arrived at the house within five minutes. After briefly talking with Barbara Barker, he went into the Risch house. In the kitchen, he found the bloody smears on the walls, an overturned table, and the handset of the wall-mounted telephone ripped loose and thrown in the wastebasket, which had been taken from its usual place under the sink and left in the middle of the floor.

McHugh believed Risch might have committed suicide, and searched the house for her body. When he did not find it, he realized he would need backup searching the surrounding area. He called the desk officer who had dispatched him and advised him to call the chief, Leo Algeo. It was possible, he believed, that the entire department would need to be involved.

The department called local hospitals and asked to be notified if a woman matching Risch's description showed up, or already had been admitted. Barker had called Martin Risch's company to find out where he was; when she learned he was in New York on business, the Massachusetts State Police called him there to inform him of the family emergency. He changed his plans and caught the next flight back to Boston.

In the house, the police found some further clues. Four letters delivered that day to the mailbox at the foot of the driveway had not yet been brought in. In the kitchen, the telephone directory was found to have been opened to the page where emergency numbers could be written down, although none had been. Martin Risch explained that an empty liquor bottle found in the wastebasket was one he and his wife had finished the night before, but could not explain where empty beer bottles found in it might have come from.

Joan Risch had left behind the trench coat she had worn to the dentist that morning but appeared to have taken a plainer cloth coat. Also in the house was her pocketbook. Investigators determined that after her purchases since cashing the check the previous evening, she would have had less than $10 ($ in modern dollars) left.

Possible later sightings

In canvassing the neighborhood, police found several other residents who reported possible sightings of Joan Risch after Barbara Barker had last seen her. At 2:45p.m. that afternoon a woman wearing clothing similar to what Risch had last been seen in, along with a kerchief over her head tied around her chin, was seen walking along the north side of Route 2A west of its junction with Old Bedford, headed toward Concord. She appeared to be wandering, hunched over as if she were cold, and appeared untidy.

A similarly dressed woman, with blood running down her legs, was seen walking north on the Route 128 median strip in Waltham between 3:15p.m. and 3:30p.m., just north of Winter Street. She, too, seemed disoriented and appeared to be cradling something at her stomach. Another sighting, reportedly around 4:30p.m., had the woman walking south along Route 128 near Trapelo Road.

Police also received some reports of the car that Virginia Keene had reported in the Risches' driveway. Their regular milkman stated that he had seen it there when he made his morning delivery five days earlier. Another neighborhood resident told investigators she had seen a blue two-tone car parked on Sunnyside Lane, a street that intersected Route 2A near Old Bedford, at 4:15p.m. She saw a man get out, cut some branches from the nearby woods, and put them in his vehicle. Another man said he saw a light blue 1959 Ford sedan parked along Sunnyside at 2:45p.m.

Blood evidence

Although the blood evidence was plentiful, investigators could not conclude from it what might have occurred. Large smears were on the kitchen walls and floor; some were on the phone as well. Three bloody fingerprints were unidentified; in Joan's absence, they could not be compared with hers. A roll of paper towels was on the floor; one had been used to wipe some blood, possibly off of a hand.

Also, a coverall and pair of underpants belonging to David were on the floor. Both were bloodied as well, possibly from an attempt to clean up the blood. The coverall also appeared to have been pressed into the floor, as if a heavy weight—such as a body—had lain on them for some time. Police said later that while the bloodstains in the kitchen might have resulted from a struggle, they seemed more consistent with someone staggering around and trying to support themselves following an injury.

But the kitchen was not the only place blood was found, and the blood found elsewhere in the house—as well as outside—complicated that narrative. A  drop was on the first step of the stairway. Two more of similar size were found at the top of the stairs, along with eight in the master bedroom and one near a window in the children's bedroom.

Another trail of blood led out of the kitchen into the driveway. It ended at Joan's car, which was stained in three places: the right rear fender, the left side of the hood near the windshield, and the very center of the trunk. Investigators found this last one particularly hard to interpret.

It could not be determined where the bleeding might have started—upstairs, in the kitchen, or the driveway; all possibilities supported by the evidence. Also, open was the question of whether she had left under her power or had been accompanied or even carried, perhaps involuntarily. The end of the trail in the driveway might have indicated that she had gotten into another car at that point, but that was not certain either.

What they did not find was also significant. Despite the large bloody smears on the kitchen floor and the apparent activity elsewhere in the house, there were no bloody footprints. Whoever had been walking there had either been extremely careful or very fortunate.

The blood was found to have been Type O, the most common, and the type Risch was known to have. A state police chemist found that despite appearances of a severe wound, the total blood shed amounted to merely half a pint, which would not have suggested a life-threatening injury.

Library records

In the wake of the disappearance, Sareen Gerson, a reporter with The Fence Viewer, Lincoln's local newspaper, went to the town's public library to research similar cases as background. In one of the books she looked in, about the purported disappearance of Brigham Young's 27th wife, she saw that Joan Risch had checked the book out in September, a month before her disappearance. In another, Into Thin Air, about a woman who, like Risch, had left behind blood smears and a towel when she went missing, Gerson again found Risch's signature on the checkout card.

She reported her findings in the newspaper. A group of library volunteers who looked through records found that Risch, a regular borrower, had taken out 25 books over the summer of 1961, many of which also had to do with murders and missing-persons cases. Based on this, Gerson and her journalistic colleagues believed Risch might have staged the apparent crime scene and disappeared voluntarily.

Possible suspects

Confirmed alibis proved that Risch's husband, the mailman, and the milkman were elsewhere at the time of Risch's disappearance. Police also investigated a man on whom neighbors had cast suspicion,
Robert Foster of East Walpole. In 1959 Congress had designated an area which included the Risch's neighborhood as Minute Man National Historical Park, recognizing its historical importance as the route British troops had taken when they marched out of Boston to the Battles of Lexington and Concord on April 19, 1775, considered the beginning of the Revolutionary War. Plans called for acquiring and removing all structures built after 1775, thus restoring the area to its historic appearance.
Foster, a purchasing agent with the National Park Service, had been visiting homes in the area to discuss the project. According to a state police detective who interviewed him a week after the disappearance, some of the women he had talked to felt he had "overstayed his welcome." Records showed Foster had visited the Risch home on September 25, a month before Joan vanished.

On the day Risch disappeared, Foster told the detective, he went out for lunch with his supervisor around 1 p.m. By 3 p.m., he recalled, he went back to the Lincoln area to meet with a property appraiser. The supervisor verified the account and also vouched for two civil engineers who had been working in the area for him making preparations for the park, saying they were in his office around 3 p.m. as well.

Subsequent developments

Rewards for information that would close the case were offered by the state police, the town of Lincoln, and the Boston Record American newspaper, which ran an extensive package of articles about the case on the first weekend of 1962. Yet no useful leads were developed after the initial investigation. Bodies found in the region in later years proved not to be Joan Risch.

Martin Risch continued to live in the same house and raise his children. He never had his wife declared legally dead. In 1975 the National Park Service, in developing the area for the park, bought the Risches' and others' properties and moved the Risch house to Lexington; Risch moved to another house nearby. The stretch of Old Bedford Road where the house stood still exists, but is closed to vehicular traffic. Martin Risch died in 2009 at the age of 79.

Theories

With no further evidence emerging after the initial investigation, all theories of Risch's fate have remained, and the case maintains its open status. The library history and her difficult past have supported Gerson's theory that her disappearance was planned as a way to escape a dissatisfying life. But Morton, the college friend who had recommended the dentist Risch visited that morning, said that was unlikely, as Risch was very content with her life as a suburban housewife.

"I think Joan is almost certainly dead," Morton told the Boston Globe in 1996. "She would never have left her family on her own." The reported sightings of a woman who matched Risch's description walking along area roads have lent support to a theory that she met an accidental end. In the 1990s, one investigator believed that she might have become disoriented and fallen into a pit along the Route 128 construction sites, where she might not have been able to extricate herself and ended up buried when the road was finished.

Martin Risch rarely talked about the case in his later years. On one occasion when he had, the Globe reported, he believed his wife was still alive. Perhaps, he said, she had had some sort of amnesia episode or other psychological break and had forgotten how to return home. However, she had no history of mental illness, nor had any been reported in her family.

Chief Algeo continued to pursue the case, even after his 1970 retirement. He told the Globe it was "sort of a stone around [his] neck." He had a theory but preferred not to share it. "I thought they'd find a body or bones or something ... Things do turn up. People don't disappear without a trace." He, too, died in 2009, the last of the original investigators on the case.

See also

List of people who disappeared

References

External links

Joan Risch at the Charley Project

1960s missing person cases
Missing person cases in Massachusetts
Lincoln, Massachusetts
History of Middlesex County, Massachusetts
1961 in Massachusetts
October 1961 events in the United States